Nové Dvory is a market town in Kutná Hora District in the Central Bohemian Region of the Czech Republic. It has about 900 inhabitants. The town centre is well preserved and is protected by law as an urban monument zone.

Administrative parts
The village of Ovčáry is an administrative part of Nové Dvory.

Geography
It lies in the Central Elbe Table lowland. The market town is situated on the right bank of the Klejnárka River. Ovčárecký Pond is located in the southern part of the territory.

History
The first written mention of Nové Dvory is from 1370. The area was owned and settled by Cistercian monks from the nearby Sedlec Abbey. After the abbey was destroyed by the Hussites in 1421, Nové Dvory was acquired by the royal chamber. Nové Dvory changed hands often as the kings pledged the village to various people. In the first half of the 16th century, it was owned by the restored Sedlec Abbey. In 1552, Nové Dvory was bought by Hynek Martinický, who established gardens and a pond here. After that, it often changed owners again, the most notable owners being the Zierotin family.

In 1701, Nové Dvory was promoted to a market town by Emperor Leopold I.

Demographics

Sights

The main landmarks are the Nové Dvory Castle with the Church of Saint Martin, connected together by an arcade corridor. A fortress in Nové Dvory, first documented in 1534, was rebuilt into a Renaissance castle in 1588, then it was completely rebuilt in the early Baroque style by Count Bernard Věžník in 1679–1686. The neighbouring Chapel of Saint Martin was rebuilt into a church around 1683. Today the building of the castle serves as a primary school.

The Dominican monastery was built in the early Baroque style in 1727, its Church of Saint Anne was built in 1695–1696. Today the premises of the monastery are unused.

In the north is the castle park of the Kačina castle. A large part of the territory of Nové Dvory, including this castle park, belongs to the Žehušicko Landscape Monument Zone. It is a unique composed baroque cultural landscape.

References

External links

Market towns in the Czech Republic